Jafar Mondal (born 25 December 1999) is an Indian professional footballer who plays as a goalkeeper for Churchill Brothers in the I-League.

Career 
Jafar made his professional debut for the Churchill Brothers against Punjab F.C. on 1 December 2019 at Fatorda Stadium, He started and played full match, he kept clean sheet as Churchill Brothers won 3–0.

Career statistics

References

1999 births
Living people
People from West Bengal
Indian footballers
Churchill Brothers FC Goa players  
Footballers from West Bengal
I-League players
Association football goalkeepers
Peerless SC players